The Torture Never Stops may refer to:

"The Torture Never Stops" (song), a 1976 song by Frank Zappa
The Torture Never Stops (video), a 2008 live video by Frank Zappa